Knabl is a German surname. Notable people with the surname include:

 Alois Knabl (born 1992), Austrian triathlete
 Joseph Knabl (1819–1881), Austrian sculptor 
 Karl Knabl (1850–1904), German painter
 Richard Knabl (1789–1874), Austrian parish priest and epigraphist 

German-language surnames